Emma Robinson may refer to:

 Emma Robinson (rower) (born 1971), Canadian rower
 Emma Robinson (Irish swimmer) (born 1978), retired Irish swimmer
Emma Robinson (New Zealand swimmer) (born 1994), Olympic swimmer from New Zealand
Emma Robinson, series of novels by Linda Sole
 Emma Robinson (author) (1814–1890), British author